The following is a list of National Register of Historic Places listings in Lapeer County, Michigan.  Lapeer County was founded in 1822 and has a current estimated population of almost 90,000.  It is officially listed as part of Metro Detroit with Lapeer as a county seat.

The county currently contains 24 properties listed on the National Register of Historic Places.  All 24 of these sites are also listed as Michigan State Historic Sites, in which the county contains 43 such state listed properties.  The listings on the National Register include 15 houses, four historic districts, one former train station, former courthouse, a bank, a mill, and the restricted Younge Site.  The Warren Perry house has since been moved from its original location.  The city of Lapeer has the most listings with 13.



Current listings

|}

See also

List of Michigan State Historic Sites in Lapeer County, Michigan
National Register of Historic Places listings in Michigan
Listings in neighboring counties: Genesee, Macomb, Oakland, St. Clair, Sanilac, Tuscola

References

Lapeer County
Lapeer County, Michigan
Tourist attractions in Metro Detroit